Winds of Heaven, Stuff of Earth is the third album by American singer and songwriter Rich Mullins, released in 1988. The album received 31st place in the book CCM Presents: The 100 Greatest Albums in Christian Music (2001).

"Awesome God" became a very popular contemporary worship song, and received first place in the book CCM Presents: 100 Greatest Songs in Christian Music (2006).

Track listing
 "The Other Side of the World" (Rich Mullins) – 2:45
 "With the Wonder" (Rich Mullins) – 4:32
 "Awesome God" (Rich Mullins) – 3:05
Appeared on compilation Songs 1996
 "If I Stand" (Rich Mullins, Steve Cudworth) – 3:46
Appeared on compilation Songs 1996
 "Home" (Rich Mullins) – 4:05
Appeared on compilation Songs 2 1999
 "Such a Thing as Glory" (Rich Mullins) – 2:44
 "...and I Love You" (Rich Mullins) – 3:55
 "Ready for the Storm" (Dougie MacLean) – 3:42
Appeared on compilation Songs 2 1999
 "One True Love" (Rich Mullins, Steve Cudworth) – 4:08
 "How Can I Keep Myself from Singing" (Rich Mullins) – 3:53

Personnel 

 Rich Mullins – lead vocals, backing vocals (4, 8)
 Reed Arvin – keyboards (1, 2, 3, 5, 6, 7, 9, 10), Synclavier (1, 2, 3, 5, 6, 7, 9, 10), string arrangements (3, 5)
 Michael W. Smith – acoustic piano (4)
 Jerry McPherson – guitars (1-5, 7, 9, 10)
 Jon Goin – guitars (8)
 Gary Lunn – bass guitar (1-5, 7, 9)
 Craig Nelson – acoustic bass (8)
 Keith Edwards – drums (1-5, 7, 9)
 Rafael Padilla – percussion (1, 6, 8, 10)
 Fred Carpenter – fiddle (8)
 Alan Arnett – backing vocals (3)
 Janis Ellen Broughton – backing vocals (3)
 Heidi Brown – backing vocals (3)
 Susan Coker – backing vocals (3)
 Scott Coupland – backing vocals (3)
 Lyn Curley – backing vocals (3)
 Jennifer Farrar – backing vocals (3)
 Allison Gordley – backing vocals (3)
 Pam Mark Hall – backing vocals (3)
 Chris Harris – backing vocals (3, 4, 7, 10)
 Paul Harris – backing vocals (3)
 Mark Heimermann – backing vocals (3, 7, 10)
 Kim Hill – backing vocals (3)
 Bryan Lenox – backing vocals (3)
 Lori Lee Loving – backing vocals (3)
 David McCracken – backing vocals (3)
 Marita Meinerts – backing vocals (3)
 Carmen Minard – backing vocals (3)
 Pam Ourada – backing vocals (3)
 Cynthia Ratliff – backing vocals (3)
 Mark Ratliff – backing vocals (3)
 Melinda Scruggs – backing vocals (3)
 Billy Sprague – backing vocals (3)
 Wayne Kirkpatrick – backing vocals (4, 6)
 Billy Simon – backing vocals (4)
 Bonnie Keen – backing vocals (6)
 Melodie Tunney – backing vocals (6)
 Chris Rodriguez – backing vocals (7, 8, 10)

Production 

 Reed Arvin – producer
 Terry Hemmings – executive producer
 Jeff Moseley – executive producer
 Brent King – recording, mixing
 Jeff Balding – additional mixing
 Hank Williams – mastering
 Glenn Hall – photography
 Buddy Jackson – design
 Gold Mine Studios, Nashville, Tennessee – recording studio
 OmniSound Studios, Nashville, Tennessee – recording studio
 Spence Manor, Nashville, Tennessee – recording studio
 MasterMix, Nashville, Tennessee - mix location, mastering location

Charts

References

1988 albums
Rich Mullins albums
Albums produced by Reed Arvin